Cully Fredricksen is an American actor mostly recognized for portraying General Rahm Kota in the Star Wars video games The Force Unleashed, The Force Unleashed II, and Battlefront: Elite Squadron.
He is also recognized for appearing in films such as Bram Stoker's Dracula, Wes Craven's New Nightmare, and Star Trek: First Contact.

Fredricksen is one of the few actors to appear in both the Star Wars franchise and the Star Trek franchise. He also played several villains.

Filmography

Film

Television

Videogames

External links

References

American male film actors
American male television actors
American male voice actors
American male video game actors
Living people
Year of birth missing (living people)